False dittany is a common name for several plants and may refer to:

Ballota acetabulosa
Ballota pseudodictamnus

See also
Dittany